Tales of the Loremasters is a 1989 role-playing game adventure for Rolemaster published by Iron Crown Enterprises.

Plot summary
Tales of the Loremasters is an adventure in which the setting is a string of remote islands one thousand miles west of Emer.

Publication history
Tales of the Loremasters was written by Thomas Kane, with a cover by Tony Roberts, and illustrations by Jennell Jaquays, and was published by Iron Crown Enterprises in 1989 as a 32-page book.

Reception
Oliver Johnson reviewed Tales of the Loremasters for Games International magazine, and gave it 3 1/2 stars out of 5, and stated that "generally non player characters are well thought out, particular in the Night Come Soon scenario."

Notes

References

Fantasy role-playing game adventures
Role-playing game supplements introduced in 1989
Rolemaster
Shadow World (role-playing game)